Webaroo is a free, closed-source offline web browser for Microsoft Windows. It uses a web interface for its control panel, whose main purpose is to download websites for offline browsing. It is targeted towards laptops and mobile devices. A beta version was released in the second week of April 2006 and no newer versions have been released since. Currently, Webaroo is only available for Pocket PCs and Pocket PC phones running Windows Mobile 2003 SE and Windows Mobile 5.0.

Webaroo is free to download. The software needs to be first downloaded and installed on a laptop or a desktop computer and subsequently installed on a mobile device. Users also need to download web content through the Webaroo control panel before they can browse it offline, however this feature is no longer functional. Content comes in two types: web sites, downloaded directly from the internet, or web packs downloaded from the Webaroo site, but web packs are also currently unavailable and Webaroo connection to the site is down.

New website 
, webaroo.com redirects to the SMS GupShup website owned by Webaroo Technology (India) Private Limited and there is no more online support from webaroo.com. This includes the repository for Webaroo web packs.

Web Packs 
Web packs are a collection of web pages that are compressed and indexed into one unit. This is useful to search a variety of content on a particular topic without the need of downloading individual web sites. Web packs vary in size from 5-20 MB to 6 GB (for the web pack of the entire Wikipedia).

References 

Windows web browsers